Missoula most commonly refers to Missoula, Montana, United States.

Missoula may also refer to:
Missoula Metropolitan Area
Missoula County
Glacial Lake Missoula
USS Missoula, naval vessels
Fort Missoula